18 February Stadium, or Stade du 18-février, is a multi-use stadium in Biskra, Algeria. It is currently used mostly for football matches and it is the home ground of football club US Biskra. The stadium holds 30,000 people. The stadium is a part of El Alia Sport Complex.

References 

Football venues in Algeria
Buildings and structures in Biskra Province
US Biskra